Adam Kozák (born 11 June 1999) is a Czech volleyball player, a member of the club VSC Zlín.

Sporting achievements

Clubs 
Czech Cup:
  2017
Czech Championship:
  2017, 2018

References

External links
 CVF profile
 Volleyball-Movies profile
 CEV profile
 U19.Boys.2017.Volleyball.FIVB profile

1999 births
Living people
Czech men's volleyball players